Rendall's serotine (Pseudoromicia rendalli) is a species of vesper bat. It is found in Benin, Botswana, Burkina Faso, Cameroon, Central African Republic, Chad, Republic of the Congo, Democratic Republic of the Congo, Gambia, Ghana, Kenya, Malawi, Mali, Mozambique, Niger, Nigeria, Rwanda, Senegal, Sierra Leone, Somalia, South Africa, Sudan, Tanzania, Uganda, and Zambia. Its natural habitats are  savanna and subtropical or tropical shrubland,.
It is threatened by habitat loss.

The species was first described in 1889 as Vesperago Rendalli by Oldfield Thomas, based on a specimen collected by dr. Percy Rendall at Bathurst, on the river Gambia.

References

Pseudoromicia
Taxonomy articles created by Polbot
Mammals described in 1889
Bats of Africa
Taxa named by Oldfield Thomas
Taxobox binomials not recognized by IUCN